WHF may refer to:

 Wadi Halfa Airport, Sudan (IATA code: WHF)
 Warhammer Fantasy (disambiguation), games 
 Weihui railway station, Henan, China (telegraph code: WHF) 
 Women in Housing and Finance, a professional association in New York City 
 World Heart Federation, association of cardiology associations
 World Holocaust Forum, promotes remembrance of the Holocaust